Pemba North Region or North Pemba Region  (Mkoa wa Pemba Kaskazini in Swahili) is one of the 31 regions of Tanzania. The region is comparable in size to the combined land area of the nation state of Saint Lucia. and the administrative region is located entirely on the island of Pemba. Pemba North Region is bordered to the north by Indian Ocean, south by Pemba South Region and the west by Pemba channel. The regional capital is Wete. According to the 2012 census, the region has a total population of 211,732.

Administrative divisions

Districts
Pemba North Region is divided into two districts, each administered by a council:

References

 
Pemba Island
Regions of Tanzania